Cornelius Harris (May 14, 1906 – January 1972) was an American Negro league outfielder in the 1930s.

A native of Calhoun, Alabama, Harris was the brother of fellow Negro leaguer Vic Harris. He played for the Pittsburgh Crawfords in 1931, posting eight hits in 25 plate appearances over seven recorded games. Harris died in Pittsburgh, Pennsylvania in 1972 at age 65.

References

External links
Baseball statistics and player information from Baseball-Reference Black Baseball Stats and Seamheads

1906 births
1972 deaths
Date of death missing
Pittsburgh Crawfords players
Baseball outfielders
Baseball players from Alabama
People from Lowndes County, Alabama
20th-century African-American sportspeople